Augusto Algueró Dasca (23 February 1934 – 16 January 2011) was a Spanish composer, arranger and music director. He wrote more than 500 songs and about 200 musical scores for films and television.

Career
Algueró was born in Barcelona, and studied both music and medicine. Among his most famous songs are "Penélope", which was performed by Joan Manuel Serrat, as well as "Noelia" by Nino Bravo, "Tómbola" by Marisol and "La chica yé-yé" by Concha Velasco.

"Vivo Cantando" tied for first place with other three songs with 18 points. This win marked Spain's second win in the contest and the first time that a country had won two years in a row. At the  he conducted the Spanish entry, "Gwendolyne" sung by Julio Iglesias.

He was also the musical director of the first OTI Festival, which was held in Madrid in 1972, and also conducted "Niña", sung by Marisol, representing Spain, "Busco mi destino", sung by Rona, representing Uruguay, "Sabes que aquí estamos América", sung by Victor Heredia, representing Argentina, "Glória Glória Aleluia", sung by Tonicha, representing Portugal, "Oh señor", sung by Basilio, representing Panama and "Siempre habrá en la luna una sonrisa", sung by Fernando Casado, representing the Dominican Republic. He conducted at the interval act an orchestral medley of two of his songs, "Penélope" and "Te Quiero, Te Quiero".

Algueró died at his home in Torremolinos, at the age of 76, after suffering a heart attack.

Selected filmography

References

1934 births
2011 deaths
Musicians from Barcelona
Spanish pop musicians
Eurovision Song Contest conductors
20th-century Spanish musicians
Spanish conductors (music)
Male conductors (music)
Spanish composers
Spanish male composers
20th-century conductors (music)
20th-century Spanish male musicians